Under a Red Sky Night is the début (and unique) solo studio album by Irish musician Martin Tourish, released in May 2014.

Overview
Martin Tourish is an accordionist, composer and producer from Co. Donegal, Ireland. Named 'Young Musician of the Year' in 2008 by TG4, his compositions are played by Altan, The Chieftains, Macklemore and Ryan Lewis amongst others.

Following almost a decade after Clan Ranald (2005), his previous unique collaboration effort with traditional Irish musician Luke Ward (from Cavan), Under A Red Sky Night is Martin's very first solo album. Featuring a cast of nineteen musicians and nearly 56 minutes of Martin's compositions and arrangements, it was released to highly positive reviews.

According to Martin Tourish, much of the music on Under A Red Sky Night began either as improvisations that were later shaped into compositions, or as a re-imagining of material from the traditional idiom. Each of the tunes and sets are snapshots of the spirit of a particular time and place and the people and ideas that floated within it. The tracks on this album were produced to give as much of a sense of this as was possible and Martin Tourish hope that the listener enjoy exploring each of these microcosms as much as he did.

Track listing

References

External links
 Official website – Martin Tourish 
 Claddagh Records website / Martin Tourish - Under A Red Sky Night – Under A Red Sky Night

2014 debut albums
Folk albums by Irish artists
Celtic albums by Irish artists